Eli Gabay (also credited as Eli Gabe; born 1 June 1959) is a Canadian actor.

He is known for voicing Quetzal, the teacher at School in the Sky, as well as voicing Max and Emmy's father, in Dragon Tales and a gangster named Abrego in the anime, Black Lagoon. Gabay also loaned his voice in other anime such as Earth Maiden Arjuna, Master Keaton and Shakugan No Shana.

Besides animation, Gabay has played live-action roles such as Miguel in Bordello of Blood, the pilot in The Edge and Carlos in the NC-17 movie Bliss. Gabay has also appeared in TV shows, such as The Commish and ReGenesis.

Notable roles
 Black Lagoon, voice of Abrego, Neo Nazi Soldier
 Bliss, as Carlos
 Bordello of Blood, as Miguel
 Dragon Tales, voice of Quetzal and Emmy and Max's father.
 Dr. Dolittle 3, voice of Rodeo Steer, Rodeo Bull
 Earth Maiden Arjuna, voice of Juna's Father
 Homeworld 2, voice of Fleet Intelligence
 Kessen, voice of Tadakatsu Honda 
 Master Keaton, voice of Hunter
 Little Girl Lost: The Delimar Vera Story, as Detective Eddie Gutierrez
 ReGenesis, John Ricci (2 episodes) 
 Shakugan No Shana, voice of Sydonay (Season 1)
 Tetsujin 28, voice of Col. Spencer
 The Commish, Rudy Mendoza (2 episodes), Brett Connors (1 episode)
 The Devil You Know, Narrator
 The Edge, as the Jet Pilot
 Andromeda (TV series), Captain Ismael Khalid (The Banks of the Lethe)
 Highlander: The Series, Devereux (Season 1- episode 5 "Free Fall")

References

External links
 
 

1959 births
Living people
Canadian male film actors
Canadian male television actors
Canadian male voice actors
Male actors from Toronto